The St. Louis, San Francisco and Texas Railway  was a subsidiary railway to the St. Louis-San Francisco Railway (Frisco) operating 159 miles of railway line in Texas. The Frisco, including the subsidiary, formed a large X-shaped system across the states of Kansas, Missouri, Oklahoma, Texas, Arkansas, Mississippi and Alabama. It merged into SLSF at the beginning of 1964; SLSF merged into the Burlington Northern Railroad in 1980.

References

 Lewis, Robert G. Handbook of American Railroads. New York: Simmons-Boardman Publishing Corporation, 1951, pp. 19–5.

External links
 Minor, David.  "St. Louis, San Francisco and Texas Railway," Handbook of Texas Online.  Texas State Historical Association.
 History of the Frisco, St. Louis-San Francisco Railway, circa 1962.  The Frisco:  A Look Back at the St. Louis-San Francisco Railway, Springfield-Greene County (Missouri) Library.

Defunct Texas railroads
Former Class I railroads in the United States